Aries Merritt (born July 24, 1985) is an American track and field athlete who specializes in the 110 metre hurdles, and currently holds the world record in that event with a time of 12.80 s set on September 7, 2012.  He won the gold medal in the 110 metre hurdles at the 2012 Summer Olympics in London.

Background
Born in Chicago, Illinois, he moved to Marietta, Georgia at a young age, attending Joseph Wheeler High School, where he was teammates with Reggie Witherspoon. Merritt ran for the University of Tennessee from 2003 to 2006 and had a successful college career, a seven-time All-American. He took the 110 meter hurdles gold at the 2004 World Junior Championships and finished sixth at the 2006 World Athletics Final. Also in 2006, he won the NCAA Championships, Indoors and Outdoors and was undefeated in all hurdles events that year.  He broke Willie Gault's Tennessee Volunteers hurdles record. His victory at the NCAA Championships in 13.21 s was the second fastest ever collegiate time in the United States, behind only Renaldo Nehemiah. He reached the World Athletics Final in 2008, finishing in fourth.
Merritt is the first hurdler to ever win gold in the US Indoor Championship, the World Indoor Championship (Istanbul, Turkey), the US Olympic Trials, and the Olympic Games all in the same year.

Professional athletics career

2011
In the final of the 110m hurdles at the 2011 World Championships in Athletics, Merritt was initially classified 6th, with a time of 13.67 s. After Dayron Robles was disqualified, Merritt was promoted to 5th. His season's best was 13.12 s, achieved in Eugene, Oregon and Oslo.

2012
Merritt began the 2012 campaign by altering his approach to the first hurdle, switching from eight to seven steps. In an interview he stated, "[it] was pretty risky to make a change like that, but something had to be done if I was going to compete with (Liu Xiang of China and Dayron Robles of Cuba). The change allows me to maintain my momentum going into the first barrier." Merrit's change was highly successful for the 2012 indoor season as he became the indoor world champion in the 60 meters hurdles at the 2012 World Indoor Championships in Istanbul. In the final, he beat Liu Xiang and Pascal Martinot-Lagarde with a time of 7.44 s.

2012 Summer Olympics

At the Olympic trials in Oregon, Merritt won the 110 meter hurdles final in a world leading time of 12.93 s, making the Olympic team for the first time.  Merritt subsequently matched the time at two consecutive Diamond League events, at Crystal Palace and Monaco, winning both races.

At the 2012 Olympic Games in London, Merritt began by running the fastest qualifying time in the heats with a time of 13.07 s.  In the semi-finals, he was again dominant with a time of 12.94 s.  In the final, Dayron Robles and Merritt got the fastest starts but Merritt pulled ahead at hurdle 3.  He continued to a personal best of 12.92 s and a 0.12 s win over reigning world champion Jason Richardson.

World record
On September 7, 2012, at the final Diamond League meet (Memorial Van Damme) in Brussels, Belgium, Merritt ran a time of 12.80 s in the 110 meter hurdles, shattering the old world record of 12.87 s held by Dayron Robles. Merritt's performance was the largest drop in the world record for 110 meter hurdles (0.07 s) since Nehemiah in 1981. Merrit ran consistently throughout the 2012 season. The following are his times that lead-up to his world record performance in the 110 meter hurdles:

2013
Merritt finished 6th at the World Championships. After the competition, he felt very ill and was diagnosed with collapsing focal segmental glomerulosclerosis, a rare congenital kidney disease, aggravated by a parvovirus that had attacked his kidneys and bone marrow. After several months of medical treatment, he was eventually able to return to competition on the following year, albeit far from his previous registers.

2015
Merrit's recovery from his kidney problems was enough to allow him to finish third in the USATF Outdoor Championships in June, obtaining a place for the World Championship. On 28 August he won the bronze medal in the 110m hurdles, just four days before undergoing a scheduled kidney transplant.

2017
He won the 2017 IAAF Diamond League 110m hurdles in Rome on June 8, 2017

Personal bests

International competition record

References

External links

 
 
 Aries Merritt  at DyeStat

1985 births
Living people
Track and field athletes from Chicago
Track and field athletes from Georgia (U.S. state)
American male hurdlers
African-American male track and field athletes
Olympic male hurdlers
Olympic gold medalists for the United States in track and field
Athletes (track and field) at the 2012 Summer Olympics
Medalists at the 2012 Summer Olympics
World Athletics Championships athletes for the United States
World Athletics Championships medalists
World Athletics record holders
Tennessee Volunteers men's track and field athletes
Kidney transplant recipients
Diamond League winners
USA Outdoor Track and Field Championships winners
USA Indoor Track and Field Championships winners
World Athletics Indoor Championships winners
21st-century African-American sportspeople
20th-century African-American people